Piotr Kulpaka (born September 12, 1984 in Olsztyn) is a Polish footballer who is player-manager for Mysen IF in Norwegian Fourth Division

Notes
 

1984 births
Living people
Sportspeople from Olsztyn
Polish footballers
Jeziorak Iława players
Polonia Warsaw players
Polonia Bytom players
Sandecja Nowy Sącz players
Kania Gostyń players
Polish expatriate footballers
Expatriate footballers in Norway
Polish expatriate sportspeople in Norway
Association football defenders